"The Sky Is a Neighborhood" is a song by American rock band Foo Fighters. It was released as the second single from their ninth album Concrete and Gold on August 23, 2017. As of November 2017, the song had peaked at number one on the Billboard Mainstream Rock Songs chart and seven on the Alternative Songs chart.

Background
The song was one of the last written and recorded for the band's ninth studio album, Concrete and Gold, being written during a two-week break the band went on after feeling they had already completed the album. Frontman Dave Grohl, inspired by the night sky in Hawaii, wrote what would become "The Sky Is a Neighborhood", and recorded the track over the course of a single afternoon. The song was first publicly premiered at a live acoustic show by Grohl and drummer Taylor Hawkins in May 2017, at The Fillmore in San Francisco. The full band first performed the song live at a show in Iceland the following month. The final studio version was released as the album's second single on August 23, 2017.

Themes and composition
The name and phrase "The Sky Is a Neighborhood" originated from Grohl's lifelong hobby of stargazing and thinking about Earth's place in the universe, with him explaining "One night I was lying out looking up at stars. Just imagining all of these stars as places that have life on them as well, and I decided that the sky is a neighborhood, that we need to keep our s— together in order to survive in this universe full of life." The lyrics were also inspired by the video The Most Astounding Fact by astrophysicist Neil DeGrasse Tyson. Grohl explained: 

Rolling Stone described the song as "Grohl [narrating] a sleepless night worrying about the state of the planet". Some journalists noted that the line "Trouble to the right and left/ Who's side are you on?" sounded like an allusion to the political unrest found since the 2016 United States presidential election, a theme that Grohl had said had influenced him during the album's writing process.

Grohl told Radio X that the song was "the biggest thing sonically we've ever done" Spin magazine described the song's sound as a "[Rolling] Stones-esque blues ballad", while NPR described it as "a soulful stomp that turns psychedelic."

Music video
The music video for the song was directed by Grohl, and parts feature his daughters Violet and Harper. The video consists of Grohl's daughters amusing themselves with books and toys in a small cabin, while Grohl himself and the rest of the band performs on the roof with bright glowing eyes, intermittently stomping on the roof and catching the attention of the girls. Parts of the song's lyrics appear in the books the girls read. The band's performance punctures holes in the roof, creating the appearance of constellations, and eventually causes the girls to levitate and rotate in the cabin at the conclusion of the video. In one shot, a framed photo of the famous Serbian-American scientist Nikola Tesla can be seen. Grohl explained the inspiration behind the video:  Grohl explained that the inclusion of his daughters was a result of them repeatedly asking to be a part of the band's videos, and Grohl finding a good way to implement them. He also explained that he preferred directing the video because he felt he was better able to connect the song's meaning and videos himself rather than through third party written video treatments. NPR described the video as being similar to Stranger Things due to the sci-fi/fantasy setting with the involvement of young children.

Reception
The song was generally well received commercially and critically. As of September 2017, the song had peaked at number seven on the Billboard US Mainstream Rock Songs chart. ABC News singled out the song as a standout track on Concrete and Gold, stating that "within the context of the record it really stands out... Grohl sells it with his shout and the background choir of voices gives it a wonderfully ominous touch. MetalSucks praised the song's sound for being "like nothing the band has ever done before, but it still fits in perfectly with the rest of their material. This, my friends, is artistic evolution done right." Foo Fighters performed "The Sky Is a Neighborhood" at the 2018 Brit Awards where they won the award for International Group.

Personnel 
 Dave Grohl – lead vocals, guitar
 Chris Shiflett – guitar, backing vocals
 Pat Smear – guitar
 Nate Mendel – bass
 Taylor Hawkins – drums, backing vocals

Guest musicians
 Alison Mosshart – backing vocals
 Rachel Grace – violin
 Ginny Luke – violin
 Thomas Lea – viola
 Kings Bacik – cello

Charts

Weekly charts

Year-end charts

Certifications

References

2017 songs
2017 singles
Foo Fighters songs
Songs written by Dave Grohl
Songs written by Taylor Hawkins
Songs written by Nate Mendel
Songs written by Chris Shiflett
Songs written by Pat Smear
Song recordings produced by Greg Kurstin
RCA Records singles
Blues rock songs
2010s ballads